Kingdom Come is the tenth studio album by Rebecca St. James, released on March 25, 2022. Kingdom Come was St. James' first full-length studio album in eleven years and her first with Heritage Music Group. The album was preceded by two singles: "Kingdom Come", which was released on October 22, 2021 and features her brothers' Christian pop duo, for KING & COUNTRY, and "Praise", which was released on February 18, 2022.

Background and development
On January 10, 2019, St. James announced that she was writing music for a new album with frequent collaborator Tedd T. and that she had signed with Heritage Music Group, an imprint of Bethel Music. St. James' first project with Heritage Music Group was an extended play, Dawn, which was released on July 24, 2020. All seven tracks from Dawn also appear on the track listing for Kingdom Come.

Critical reception

Jonathan Andre of 365 Days of Inspiring Media gave the album 4.5 out of 5 stars, writing “This is a must-have if you love Rebecca’s music of the past, or if you are into some nostalgia from yesteryear, or both.” He named the title track, “Battle Is the Lord’s” and “Praise” as album highlights. Kelly Meade of Today’s Christian Entertainment also awarded the album 4.5 out of 5 stars, writing “As a whole, this album stands out both musically and with strong vocal performances throughout.” In a more negative review, Timothy Yap of JubileeCast gave the album 2.5 out of 5 stars, writing "Instead of letting her own identity to shine, she has tried to fit in with her brothers (the famed For King & Country) by crafting a sanitized CCM pop offering." He named "Desert Bloom," "Traveling Light," and "Fall Back" as album highlights.

Chart performance
The album did not chart on any Billboard music charts. It is her first studio album since 1991’s Refresh My Heart to not chart on the Top Christian Albums chart and her first studio album since 2005’s If I Had One Chance to Tell You Something to not chart on the Billboard 200.

Singles
The album's lead single and title track, "Kingdom Come", was released on October 22, 2021 and features her brothers' duo, For King & Country. It peaked at number eight on the Billboard Christian Digital Song Sales chart, number 26 on the Billboard Christian Airplay chart, and number 34 on the Billboard Hot Christian Songs chart.

The album's second single, "Praise", was released on February 18, 2022, along with the album's pre-order.

Track six, "Battle Is the Lord's", was previously released as the lead single for Dawn.

Track listing

Personnel 
Credits taken from the album's liner notes.

 Rebecca St. James – lead vocals
 Cubbie Fink – executive producer, background vocals, bass, electric guitar, executive video producer, videographer
 Tedd Tjornhom – production, recording, editing, piano, synths, string arrangements, programming
 Seth Mosley – production, recording, editing, background vocals, bass, electric guitar, piano, synths, string arrangements, programming
 David Leonard – production, background vocals
 Brad King – production
 Seth Talley – production, mixing
 David Smallbone – management
 Josh Smallbone – management
 Ashley Munn – management
 Jake Halm – recording, editing, background vocals, synths, string arrangements, programming
 X O'Connor – recording, editing, mixing
 Joe Henderson – editing
 Steven Servi – editing
 Alex Zwart – editing
 Crystal O'Connor – editing
 Doug Weier – mixing
 Joe Laporte – mastering
 Joel Smallbone – guest vocals (track 3), background vocals
 Luke Smallbone – guest vocals (tracks 3, 5), background vocals, drums
 Seth Condrey – background vocals
 Gemma Fink – background vocals
 Madeline Halm – background vocals
 Setnick Sene – background vocals
 Janae Shaw – background vocals
 Brandon Lake – guest vocals (track 6)
 Josh Baldwin – guest vocals (track 2)
 Kalley Heiligenthal – guest vocals (track 7)
 Austin Davis – drums
 Teddy Boldt – drums
 Garrett Tyler – drums
 Vincent DiCarlo – bass
 Daniel Waterbury – electric guitar
 Mark Campbell – electric guitar, synths, string arrangements, programming
 Benjamin Backus – piano
 Cara Fox – synths, string arrangements, programming
 Eleanore Denig – synths, string arrangements, programming
 Daniel Lopez – synths, string arrangements, programming
 Chris Estes – senior A&R director
 Adrian Thompson – A&R director
 Eric Allen – A&R manager
 David Whitworth – A&R manager
 Anna Reed – music production project manager
 Erica Boutwell – music production director
 Christian Ostrom – creative director
 Tommy Muller – marketing manager
 Daniel Byun – marketing manager
 Stephen James Hart – art director and designer
 Dario Prieto – art director and designer
 Robby Klein – director of photography, photography
 Mitchell Schleper – executive video producer, videographer

Release history

References

2022 albums
Rebecca St. James albums